Precipitate or precipitates, or variant, may refer to:
 Precipitate, the product of chemical precipitation
 Precipitate, the product of meteorological precipitation
 Precipitate (EP), an EP released by Interpol (rock band)
 "Precipitate", a song by Interpol from the EP Fukd ID 3
 Precipitate (Dead Zone), a 2003 episode of The Dead Zone

See also 
 Precipitation (disambiguation)
 Precipitate hardening
 Gold tin precipitate
 Red precipitate